Mate may refer to:

Science

 Mate, one of a pair of animals involved in:
 Mate choice, intersexual selection
 Mating 
 Multi-antimicrobial extrusion protein, or MATE, an efflux transporter family of proteins

Person or title

 Friendship
 Mateship
 Mate (naval officer)
 Chief mate, also known as first mate
 Second mate
 Third mate
 Third (curling), also known as a vice, vice-skip, or mate, the team member who delivers the second-to-last pair of a team's stones in an end

People

Given names
 Mate (given name)
 Máté (given name)

Surname
Máté (surname)

Beverages
 Mate (drink) (/ˈmɑːte/), made from the yerba mate plant
 Mate, a traditional South American container carved from a dried calabash
 Mate de coca, or coca tea

Technology
 MATE (software) (/ˈmɑːteɪ/) stylised in capitals, a fork of GNOME 2 (desktop shell for desktop hardware)
 Mate or mating condition, a synonym for constraints used in computer-aided design (CAD)
 Huawei Mate series, a smartphone series by the Chinese company Huawei

Other uses
 Mate (horse), an American Thoroughbred racehorse
 Mate (2019 film), a South Korean film
 Mate (2021 film), an Australian short film
 Mahte or Māte, epithet for goddesses in Latvian mythology
 "Mate", shortened from checkmate, a winning/losing situation in chess

Acronyms
 Marine Academy of Technology and Environmental Science, or MATES, a high school in Manahawkin, New Jersey

See also
 Inmate, a prisoner
 Mates, a surname
 Matte (disambiguation)
 Running mate, a fellow candidate for the same party in one election